The 1980 United States presidential election in Oklahoma took place on November 4, 1980. All fifty states and The District of Columbia were part of the 1980 United States presidential election. State voters chose eight electors to the Electoral College, who voted for president and vice president.

Oklahoma was won by former California Governor Ronald Reagan (R) by a 25-point landslide. It is a reliably Republican state, and the last Democratic presidential candidate to carry the state was Lyndon Johnson in 1964.

Results

Results by county

Slates of Electors
Democrat: Tobie Branch, Joe Johnson, Marzee Douglas, Sweet Pea Abernathy, Linnie Clayton Spann, Al Tesio, Loretta Jackson, Bert Russell

Republican: Robert Scott Petty, Lanny Joe Reed, Frank Douglas Stickney Sr, Ronald Neal Allen, Thomas J. Harris, Kenneth Floyd Musick, Grace Ward Boulton, Paul E. Thornbrugh

Libertarian: Mary Laurent, Fred Bross, Loren Baker, Roger Phares, Anatolly Arutunoff, Thomas Winter, Paul Woodard, Charles Burris

Independent: Aileen E. Ginther, Juanita L. Learned, Arlie J. Nixon, Linda M. Remer, James Heinicke, John Lowe, Laura Shepperd, John W. Reskovac Sr

See also
 United States presidential elections in Oklahoma
 Presidency of Ronald Reagan

References

Oklahoma
1980
1980 Oklahoma elections